José Alberto Toril Rodríguez (born 7 July 1973) is a Spanish retired professional footballer who played as a central midfielder, who currently Manager for Liga F club Real Madrid Femenino.

He was mainly associated to Real Madrid during his career – although he appeared rarely for the first team, and only amassed La Liga totals of 44 matches and two goals for a total of four clubs, in five seasons – as both a player and a manager (coaching various of its teams).

Playing career
Born in Peñarroya-Pueblonuevo, Córdoba, Andalusia, Toril joined Real Madrid's youth system at the age of 15, but appeared only twice for its first team, leaving the club in 1994 and resuming his career with RC Celta de Vigo and RCD Espanyol. With the latter, he experienced his best La Liga season in 1995–96, appearing in 17 matches (but out of a possible 42, and only playing the full 90 minutes once).

After playing no league matches for RCD Espanyol in the 1996–97 campaign, Toril signed for CF Extremadura, featuring in 40 Segunda División games en route to a top flight promotion. This was followed by immediate relegation.

Until his retirement in 2004 at the age of 31, Toril spent five seasons in the second level, with Extremadura, Albacete Balompié, Racing de Ferrol and CD Numancia, helping the latter side return to the top division after a three-year absence but only contributing with eight appearances to the feat (516 minutes).

Coaching career
Toril begun coaching still as an active player, being in charge of youth teams at Ferrol and Albacete and being assistant at amateurs CD Quintanar del Rey. In 2008, he returned to his first club Real Madrid as a technical advisor in the youth system, coaching a combined juvenil side in in-season tournaments and later being named as a mid-season replacement for Antonio Díaz Carlavilla at Real Madrid C.

In early January 2011, after nearly two years with the youth teams of Real Madrid, Toril was appointed at Real Madrid Castilla, replacing fired Alejandro Menéndez. On 29 April 2011, after leading the Segunda División B team to eight consecutive wins (eventually winning 11 out of 12 from January/March 2011), he had his contract renewed for a further two seasons.

Toril was fired by Castilla on 19 November 2013, following a 0–6 loss at SD Eibar that left the team in 22nd and last position. On 28 June 2016, after nearly three years unemployed, he was named Elche CF manager.

Honours

Manager
Real Madrid Castilla
Segunda División B: 2011–12

Managerial statistics

References

External links

1973 births
Living people
Sportspeople from the Province of Córdoba (Spain)
Spanish footballers
Footballers from Andalusia
Association football midfielders
La Liga players
Segunda División players
Segunda División B players
Real Madrid Castilla footballers
Real Madrid CF players
RC Celta de Vigo players
RCD Espanyol footballers
CF Extremadura footballers
Albacete Balompié players
Racing de Ferrol footballers
CD Numancia players
Spain youth international footballers
Spain under-21 international footballers
Spanish football managers
Segunda División managers
Segunda División B managers
Real Madrid Castilla managers
Elche CF managers
Primera División (women) managers
Real Madrid Femenino managers